The 1973–74 Drexel Dragons men's basketball team represented Drexel University during the 1973–74 men's basketball season. The Dragons, led by 3rd year head coach Ray Haesler, played their home games at the 32nd Street Armory and were members of the University–Eastern division of the Middle Atlantic Conferences (MAC).

The team finished the season 15–9, and finished in 5th place in the MAC University–Eastern Division in the regular season.

On February 6, 1974, Greg Newman set the Drexel team record for most points in a single game, scoring 40 points against Franklin & Marshall.

Roster

Schedule

|-
!colspan=9 style="background:#F8B800; color:#002663;"| Regular season
|-

References

Drexel Dragons men's basketball seasons
Drexel
1973 in sports in Pennsylvania
1974 in sports in Pennsylvania